Wassim El Banna (born 10 May 1979) is a former professional footballer who played as a forward. He has represented Odense Boldklub, Aarhus Fremad, and Vejle Boldklub in the Danish Superliga.

Born in Lebanon to Palestinian parents, El Banna obtained Danish citizenship in 1997. He represented Denmark internationally at youth level between 1997 and 1998.

Early life
El Banna, who was born in Lebanon, moved to Germany at the age of five before settling with his family in the Odense suburb Vollsmose. In 1997, El Banna obtained Danish citizenship.

Club career
El Banna started his senior career with Odense BK, making his Danish Superliga debut at age 18 in August 1997. He scored four goals in 12 games, including a hat-trick against Ikast FS, but could not keep Odense from being relegated at the end of the Danish Superliga 1997-98 season.

He spent time on loan with Superliga club Aarhus Fremad in 1999, scoring two goals in nine games in the last half of the Danish Superliga 1998-99 season, as Aarhus Fremad was relegated. He then enjoyed spells in the Danish 1st Division with all of the other big Odense clubs Dalum IF, B 1913, and B 1909, before moving to Copenhagen club BK Frem in the summer of 2005. El Banna played a total of 66 matches, scoring 28 goals during his first spell with Frem, before he was sold to Ajman Club in the United Arab Emirates in 2007.

He returned to Frem in March 2008 on an amateur contract. It was to be a rather short second stay with Frem, as he transferred to Superliga club Vejle Boldklub by the end of the season. After half a season in Vejle, the striker returned to Frem in to begin his third spell at the club, staying with Frem until the summer 2009.

In September 2009, El Banna signed an amateur contract for the remainder of the year with FC Hjørring in the Danish 2nd Division. He was without a club for a while, before signing with 2nd Division team BK Glostrup-Albertslund in April 2010.

International career
From September 1997 to December 1998, El Banna played seven games for the Denmark national under-19 and under-20 teams.

References

External links
Danish national team profile
 Boldklubben Frem profile
 Danish Superliga statistics

1979 births
Living people
Danish men's footballers
Palestinian footballers
Odense Boldklub players
Boldklubben Frem players
Vejle Boldklub players
Vendsyssel FF players
SfB-Oure FA players
Ajman Club players
Danish Superliga players
Palestinian expatriate footballers
Palestinian emigrants to Denmark
UAE First Division League players
Association football forwards
Boldklubben 1913 players
Dalum IF players
Denmark youth international footballers